Juan José Amador Castaño (born 20 April 1998) is a Colombian cyclist who currently rides for UCI Continental team .

In May 2019, Amador returned an adverse analytical finding (AAF) for boldenone – a naturally occurring anabolic–androgenic steroid (AAS) – in an out-of-competition control taken in October 2018.  folded four days later, due to the doping cases of Amador and team mate Wilmar Paredes. Amador was ultimately cleared of the charge, and returned to racing in October 2020.

Major results

2016
 1st  Time trial, National Road Championships
 1st  Team pursuit, Pan American Junior Track Championships
 Pan American Junior Road Championships
4th Time trial
9th Road race

References

External links

1998 births
Living people
Colombian male cyclists
People from Manizales
21st-century Colombian people